Narahashi (written: 楢橋, 名良橋 or 奈良橋) is a Japanese surname. Notable people with the surname include:

, Japanese footballer
, Japanese photographer
, Japanese voice actress
Toshio Narahashi (1927–2013), Japanese pharmacologist
, Japanese casting director and film producer

Japanese-language surnames